Jens Jacob Andersen was a sailor from Denmark, who represented his country at the 1928 Summer Olympics in Amsterdam, Netherlands.

Sources 
 

Sailors at the 1928 Summer Olympics – 12' Dinghy
Olympic sailors of Denmark
1892 births
1955 deaths
Danish male sailors (sport)
People from Helsingør Municipality
Sportspeople from the Capital Region of Denmark